Kvænangen is a municipality in Troms og Finnmark county, Norway. The administrative centre of the municipality is the village of Burfjord. The European route E6 highway goes through the municipality and over the Sørstraumen Bridge, and many people stop at the Kvænangsfjellet pass to view the scenery of the Kvænangen fjord.

The  municipality is the 32nd largest by area out of the 356 municipalities in Norway. Kvænangen is the 323rd most populous municipality in Norway with a population of 1,159.

General information
The municipality of Kvænangen was established in 1863 when it was separated from the large Skjervøy Municipality. The initial population of Kvænangen was 1,677. During the 1960s, there were many municipal mergers across Norway due to the work of the Schei Committee. On 1 January 1965, the Meiland area (population: 12) of Skjervøy Municipality was transferred to Kvænangen. On 1 January 1972, the uninhabited area of Mannskarvik was transferred from Skjervøy to Kvænanagen.

On 1 January 2020, the municipality became part of the newly formed Troms og Finnmark county. Previously, it had been part of the old Troms county.

Name
The municipality (originally the parish) is named after the local Kvænangen fjord since the fjord is the central geographic feature for the municipality. The first element  is the plural genitive case of the name of the Kven people who at one time were the majority of the local residents.

Coat of arms
The coat of arms was granted on 13 July 1990. The official blazon is "Argent, a harebell plant azure". This means the arms have a field (background) with a tincture of argent which means it is commonly colored white, but if it is made out of metal, then silver is used. The charge is a harebell plant that has a tincture of azure. The plant is a typical plant for the area with its harsh and cold climate. The arms were designed by Arvid Sveen.

Churches
The Church of Norway has one parish within the municipality of Kvænangen. It is part of the Nord-Troms prosti (deanery) in the Diocese of Nord-Hålogaland.

History
The municipality surrounds the Kvænangen fjord, after which it is named. The population is primarily of Sami origin, although the Kven population constitutes a sizeable minority. Archeological finds indicate nomadic activity in the area going back 10,000 years.

There is evidence that Kværnangen was the site for a transitional state between nomadic and agricultural society through what was known as "siida" - delimited areas where permanent housing was established and natural resources put under stewardship.

The Kvens settled in the area in the 18th century, occupying themselves with fishing, hunting, and agriculture. Over time, fisheries became a primary industry, and the community exported dried fish to southern areas. Ethnic Norwegians gradually immigrated to facilitate trade and administration.

Norwegian public policy in the 1930s and post-war years homogenized the three groups, ethnic Norwegians, Sami, and Kven, considerably, to the point that most residents speak Norwegian at home, regardless of their ethnic heritage. A majority of people in Kvænangen declared themselves Sami or Kven in the 1930 census. In the 1950 census, all but a handful declared themselves Norwegian.

During the Nazi occupation during World War II, a temporary work camp was established at Kvænangen. In large part due to the generosity of the local population, prisoners had ample food. As the German Wehrmacht retreated in early 1945, the population was evacuated by force, and all buildings were burned. Today, a local museum shows typical reconstruction houses.

Geography

The municipality has coastal and plains geography, extending into Finnmarksvidda. There are mature pine forests in the valley at the head of the fjord, and there are several rivers, the largest of which is Kvænangselva, which is traditionally a good salmon-fishing river.

The Øksfjordjøkelen glacier is located in the northern part of the municipality on the border with Loppa. It's the ninth largest glacier in mainland Norway. The lake Šuoikkatjávri is located in the southern part of the municipality on the border with Kautokeino. The Langfjordjøkelen is another glacier in northern Kvænangen.

There are several islands in the fjord that are part of Kvænangen municipality: Skorpa, Spildra, and Nøklan.

Climate
Kvænangen has a boreal climate with mild winters for this climate type, and very moderate precipitation with little variation between the seasons. The Köppen Climate Classification subtype for this climate is "Dfc" (continental subarctic climate). The all-time high temperature is  recorded 7 July 2021; the all-time low is  recorded 6 February 2012. There are an average of 99.3 days of precipitation each year, with the most precipitation occurring in October with 10.9 days and the least precipitation occurring in April with 5.9 days. The Norwegian Meteorological Institute has been operating a weather station in Nordstraum in Kvænangen since 1965.

Government
All municipalities in Norway, including Kvænangen, are responsible for primary education (through 10th grade), outpatient health services, senior citizen services, unemployment and other social services, zoning, economic development, and municipal roads. The municipality is governed by a municipal council of elected representatives, which in turn elect a mayor.  The municipality falls under the Nord-Troms District Court and the Hålogaland Court of Appeal.

Municipal council
The municipal council  of Kvænangen is made up of 15 representatives that are elected every four years. The party breakdown of the council is as follows:

Mayors
The mayors of Kvænangen:

1863–1888: Peder B. Giæver (H)
1889–1910: Henrik Giæver (H)
1911–1916: Gjert Rasch (H)
1917–1919: Johan Storvik (LL)
1920–1925: Gjert Rasch (H)
1926–1928: Lars Larsen Vassnes (H)
1929–1934: Johan Storvik (Ap)
1935–1937: Eli Vassnes
1938–1942: Øivind Storvik (Ap)
1943–1944: Reidar Paulsen (NS)
1945–1947: Peder Olsen (V)
1948–1951: Hedley Kristiansen (Ap)
1952–1955: Peder Olsen (V)
1956–1959: Hedley Kristiansen (Ap)
1958–1959: Einar Eriksen (Ap)
1960–1963: Kristoffer Borkenhagen (Ap)
1964–1965: Kristian Kjelsberg (Ap)
1965–1971: Kristoffer Borkenhagen (Ap)
1972–1975: Odd Følstad (Ap)
1976–1979: Ingulv Wiik (H)
1979-1979: Øivind Eilertsen (H)
1980–1983: Harald Olsen (H)
1984–1991: Sigvald Johnsen (Ap)
1992–1995: Eva Jørstad (Ap)
1995–2007: Harald Olsen (H)
2007–2011: John Helland (H)
2011–2015: Jan Helge Jensen (K)
2015–present: Eirik Losnegaard Mevik (Ap)

Notable people

Notable people that were born or lived in Kvænangen include:
 Anders Larsen (1870–1949), Sami teacher, journalist and author
 Jafet Lindeberg (1873–1962),  a gold prospector and co-founder of Nome, Alaska
 Gunnar Kaasen (1882–1960), Norwegian-American musher, helped the 1925 serum run to Nome
 Hans Eng (1907–1995) a Norwegian physician and Nazi collaborator during World War II
 Steinar Eriksen (born 1939), Norwegian businessperson and politician
 Odd Rikard Olsen (1947–2012), Norwegian newspaper editor and politician
 Eva M. Nielsen (born 1950), Norwegian politician
 Torgeir Johnsen, (Norwegian Wiki) (born 1967), Norwegian politician

References

External links
 Municipal fact sheet from Statistics Norway 
 
 
 

 
Municipalities of Troms og Finnmark
Populated places of Arctic Norway
1863 establishments in Norway